Alén is both a given name and a surname. Notable people of the name include the following:

Surname
Alberto Alén Pérez (born 1948), Cuban musicologist
Juha Alén (born 1981), Finnish ice hockey player
Markku Alén (born 1951), Finnish racing driver

Given name
Alén Diviš (1900–1956), Czech artist

See also
Alen (given name)
Alen baronets
Van Alen

Finnish-language surnames
Spanish-language surnames
Czech masculine given names